Karanlug may refer to:
 Geghhovit, Armenia
 Lusagyugh, Aragatsotn, Armenia
 Martuni, Armenia
 Khojavend (city), Azerbaijan